Blentarp is a locality situated in Sjöbo Municipality, Skåne County, Sweden with 1,216 inhabitants in 2010.

See also
Henriksdal Spring Tour

References 

Populated places in Sjöbo Municipality
Populated places in Skåne County